David Leon Toups (born 26 March 1971) is an American prelate of the Catholic Church who has served as Bishop of Beaumont since 2020. He was previously rector of St. Vincent de Paul Regional Seminary.

Biography

Early life 
David Toups was born on March 26, 1971, in Seattle, Washington. He first attended Florida Southern College in Lakeland, Florida, before entering St. John Vianney College Seminary in Miami, Florida. Toups graduated from the seminary in 1993 with a Bachelor of Arts degree in Philosophy and Theology. He then entered the Pontifical North American College in Rome. He ultimately obtained a Bachelor of Sacred Theology degree and a Licentiate of Sacred Theology from the Pontifical Gregorian Universityin Rome. He also received a Doctor in Sacred Theology degree from the Pontifical University of St. Thomas Aquinas in Rome.

Priestly career 
Toups was ordained to the priesthood for the Diocese of Saint Petersburg on June 14, 1997 at the Cathedral of Saint Jude the Apostle in St. Petersburg by Bishop Robert Lynch. He served on the diocesan Presbyteral Council from 1997 to 2001. Subsequently he served on the National Board of the National Federation of Priests’ Councils from 1997-2001. Toups also served as the parochial vicar of St. Frances Cabrini Parish in Spring Hill, Florida, from 1997 to 2001. From 2000 to 2002, he served as observer for Region IV to the U.S. Conference of Catholic Bishops (USCCB) November meetings.

In 2002, Toups went to Rome to study at the Angelicum, receiving a Doctor of Sacred Theology degree in 2004. After returning to Florida, he served at St. Vincent de Paul Regional Seminary in Boynton Beach, Florida, as professor of sacramental and liturgical theology, assistant dean of students, and then dean of students. He also served as a member of the Administrative Council, the Faculty Council and the Seminary Formation Team for the diocese until 2006. From 2007 to 2010, Toups also served as the associate director of the Secretariat of Clergy, Consecrated Life and Vocations at the USCCB.

Toups became the pastor of Christ the King Parish in 2010, serving there until 2012. Since 2012, Toups had served as rector of the St. Vincent de Paul Regional Seminary.

Bishop of Beaumont
On June 9, 2020, Pope Francis appointed Toups as bishop of the Diocese of Beaumont. He was consecrated by Cardinal Daniel DiNardo on August 21, 2020 at the Cathedral Basilica of St. Anthony in Beaumont. Toups chose as his episcopal motto Romans 8:28, based on his predecessor's motto and his mother's favorite quote, “For those who love God, all things work together for good.”

See also 

 Catholic Church hierarchy
 Catholic Church in the United States
 Historical list of the Catholic bishops of the United States
 List of Catholic bishops of the United States
 Lists of patriarchs, archbishops, and bishops
 St. Vincent de Paul Regional Seminary

References

External links

 Roman Catholic Diocese of Beaumont Official Site  
 Roman Catholic Diocese of Saint Petersburg Official Site

Episcopal succession

 
 

1971 births
Living people
People from Seattle
21st-century Roman Catholic bishops in the United States
Bishops appointed by Pope Francis